2-Chloro-9,10-diphenylanthracene is a fluorescent dye used in glow sticks for a blue-green glow.  It is a chlorinated derivative of 9,10-diphenylanthracene.

See also
 2-Chloro-9,10-bis(phenylethynyl)anthracene

References 

Fluorescent dyes
Anthracenes
Chloroarenes